Lawrence Bekisisa Zulu was a South African Anglican bishop.

Personal life 

Zulu went to Cambridge University and graduated with a BA in 1965 and an MA in 1969.

Church life
Zulu was Bishop of Zululand, from 1975 to 1993, and Bishop of Swaziland, from 1993 to 2002.

He attended the Seventh General Assembly of the All Africa Conference of Churches.

Notes and references 

Alumni of the University of Cambridge
Anglican bishops of Zululand
Anglican bishops of Swaziland
20th-century Anglican Church of Southern Africa bishops
Date of birth missing
Date of death missing